This is a list of events in British radio during 1970.

Events

January
23 January – Radio North Sea International begins test broadcasts.

February
8 February – DJ Annie Nightingale presents her first show on BBC Radio 1; she will still be broadcasting on the channel more than 50 years later.
11 February – "Pirate" radio station Radio North Sea International begins regular broadcasts to the UK from Mebo II off the Dutch coast.

March
24 March – RNSI's ship Mebo II anchors in international waters off Clacton.

April
3 April – Any Questions is broadcast on Radio 2 for the final time. Previously, BBC Radio 4 has carried only the Saturday lunchtime repeat; now both the Friday evening and Saturday lunchtime airings of the programme will be heard on Radio 4.
4 April
BBC Radio’s sports coverage (other than Test cricket) transfers from BBC Radio 3 to BBC Radio 2 and the first edition of Sport on 2 is broadcast.
BBC Radio 4 begins broadcasting satirical radio current affairs sketch show Week Ending, which becomes a "training ground" for comedy writers and producers.
5 April – Your Hundred Best Tunes moves from BBC Radio 4 to BBC Radio 2.
6 April – On BBC Radio 4, programmes which will still be running more than 50 years later are introduced:
The first edition of PM, the early evening news and current affairs programme, airs.
The first Thought for the Day is broadcast, replacing ‘’Ten to Eight’’.
The first edition of Start the Week is broadcast, with Richard Baker as presenter.
10 April – First broadcast of Radio 4's current affairs programme Analysis, another programme which will still be running more than 50 years later.
15 April – The UK government begins jamming Radio North Sea International.

May
No events

June
13–20 June – Radio North Sea International rebrands as Radio Caroline International during the general election campaign.

July
July – Kenny Everett is dismissed by BBC Radio 1 after making cheeky remarks about the Transport Minister's wife following a news item.

August
No events.

September
1 September – United Biscuits launches its own radio station United Biscuits Network which is broadcast round the clock to the company's four factories.
 September – BBC Radio 4 begins broadcasting the Sunday morning religious magazine programme, which will still be running more than 50 years later.

October
5 October – The daily consumer affairs programme You and Yours debuts on Radio 4; it will still be running more than 50 years later.
9 October – Round Table, a weekly programme discussions the week’s new releases, is broadcast for the first time on Radio 1. Emperor Rosko is the programme’s host.
October – The  In Concert brand begins to be used on BBC Radio 1.

November
No events.

December
No events.

Station debuts
2 January – BBC Radio Newcastle
10 September – BBC Radio Manchester
1 September – United Biscuits Network (1970–1979)
4 September – BBC Radio Bristol
6 October – BBC Radio London (1970–1988)
29 October – BBC Radio Oxford
9 November – BBC Radio Birmingham
18 December – BBC Radio Medway
31 December – BBC Radio Solent, Radio Teesside

Programme debuts
 4 April – Week Ending on BBC Radio 4 (1970–1998)
 6 April – Start the Week on BBC Radio 4 (1970–Present)
 6 April – PM on BBC Radio 4 (1970–Present)
 September – Sunday on BBC Radio 4 (1970–Present)
 5 October – You and Yours on BBC Radio 4 (1970–Present)

Continuing radio programmes

1940s
 Sunday Half Hour (1940–2018)
 Desert Island Discs (1942–Present)
 Down Your Way (1946–1992)
 Letter from America (1946–2004)
 Woman's Hour (1946–Present)
 A Book at Bedtime (1949–Present)

1950s
 The Archers (1950–Present)
 The Today Programme (1957–Present)
 The Navy Lark (1959–1977)
 Sing Something Simple (1959–2001)
 Your Hundred Best Tunes (1959–2007)

1960s
 Farming Today (1960–Present)
 In Touch (1961–Present)
 The Men from the Ministry (1962–1977)
 I'm Sorry, I'll Read That Again (1964–1973)
 Petticoat Line (1965–1979)
 The World at One (1965–Present)
 The Official Chart (1967–Present)
 Just a Minute (1967–Present)
 The Living World (1968–Present)
 The Organist Entertains (1969–2018)

Births
2 January – Bam Bam (Peter Jarrod Poulton), radio presenter
14 February – Simon Pegg, comedian, film and television actor and writer, radio personality
15 February – Jonny Dymond, journalist and presenter
18 June – Katie Derham, radio presenter
23 November – Zoe Ball, television and radio presenter
25 November – Emma B, radio presenter
2 December – Jo Russell, radio presenter
Verity Sharp, music presenter

See also 
 1970 in British music
 1970 in British television
 1970 in the United Kingdom
 List of British films of 1970

References

Radio
British Radio, 1970 In
Years in British radio